The Mills Blue Rhythm Band was an American big band active during the 1930s.

The band was formed in New York City, United States, in 1930 by drummer Willie Lynch as the Blue Rhythm Band, and then briefly operated as the Coconut Grove Orchestra. Irving Mills became its manager in 1931 and it subsequently assumed the name Mills Blue Rhythm Band. Compere Jimmy Ferguson (Baron Lee) replaced Lynch. Another brief leader, reeds player Bingie Madison, left at the time of the final name change. Over its lifetime, the group was known as the "Blue Rhythm Band", "Blue Ribbon Band", "Blue Rhythm Boys", "The Blue Racketeers", "Earl Jackson's Musical Champions", "Earl Jackson and his Orchestra", "Duke Wilson and his Ten Blackberries", "King Carter's Royal Orchestra", "Mills Music Masters", "Harlem Hot Shots". It accompanied Louis Armstrong on some record sides.

The Mills Blue Rhythm Band were based at The Cotton Club in Harlem. They worked steadily through the 1930s deputizing for the orchestra of Duke Ellington and Cab Calloway, often taking their undesirable engagements. Mills managed Ellington and Calloway as well. Edgar Hayes, Eddie Mallory and Dave Nelson all had temporary stints as band leader, until Lucky Millinder permanently took over the role in 1934.

The band recorded 150 sides for labels including Brunswick, Columbia, Victor, the ARC stable of labels (including Oriole, Perfect, Regal, Romeo, Banner, Melotone, Domino), Variety, and Vocalion. Although a few of their records became hits (including "Truckin'" and "Ride, Red, Ride") and the MBRB had a line-up of talented soloists, the group never attained the prominence of their peers. This has been attributed to the lack of a single identifiable leader, and Irving Mills' preference to have the band perform an understudy role.

By 1937, the group was billed as Lucky Millinder and his Orchestra and disbanded in 1938. Millinder joined Bill Doggett's band before reforming it into his own orchestra in 1940.

Irving Mills revived the Mills Blue Rhythm Band name for two recording sessions in 1947, under the guidance of Van Alexander. The only original band member performing at either of the 1947 sessions was trumpeter Charlie Shavers.

Members
 Red Allen – trumpet
 Hayes Alvis – double bass
 Ed Anderson – trumpet
 Harold Arnold  – tenor saxophone
 Buster Bailey – clarinet
 Billy Banks
 Danny Barker – guitar
 Alfred Cobbs – trombone
 Carroll Dickerson – violin
 Harry "Sweets" Edison – trumpet
 Joe Garland – tenor saxophone, arrangements
 Edgar Hayes – piano
 Shelton Hemphill – trumpet
 J. C. Higginbotham – trombone
 Alex Hill – piano
 Charlie Holmes – alto saxophone
 Benny James – guitar
 Elmer James – bass
 Wardell Jones – trumpet
 Billy Kyle – piano
 Baron Lee (Jimmy Ferguson)
 Lawrence Lucie – guitar
 Willie Lynch – drums
 Bingie Madison – clarinet, tenor saxophone
 Eddie Mallory – trumpet
 Castor McCord – saxophone
 Ted McCord – saxophone
 Gene Mikell – clarinet, alto saxophone
 Lucky Millinder – bandleader
 Frankie Newton – trumpet
 Lester Nichols – drums
 Wilbur de Paris – trombone
 Charlie Shavers – trumpet
 Tab Smith – alto saxophone
 O'Neil Spencer – drums
 Bob Stephens
 Carl Warwick – trumpet
 George Washington – trombone
 Crawford Wethington – clarinet – alto saxophone – baritone saxophone
 Harry White – trombone
 Ben Williams – tenor saxophone
 Eddie Williams – tenor saxophone
 John Williams – double bass

References

American jazz ensembles from New York City
Big bands
Territory bands
Musical groups established in 1930
1930 establishments in New York City